"Partings" is the fifth episode of the first season of the American fantasy television series The Lord of the Rings: The Rings of Power, based on the novel The Lord of the Rings and its appendices by J. R. R. Tolkien. Set in the Second Age of Middle-earth, thousands of years before Tolkien's The Hobbit and The Lord of the Rings, it follows a large cast of characters as they prepare for upcoming conflicts. The episode was written by Justin Doble and directed by Wayne Che Yip.

Amazon made a multi-season commitment for a new The Lord of the Rings series in November 2017. J. D. Payne and Patrick McKay were set to develop it in July 2018. Filming for the first season took place in New Zealand, and work on episodes beyond the first two began in January 2021. Yip was revealed to be directing four episodes of the season that March, including the fifth episode. Production wrapped for the season in August 2021.

"Partings" premiered on the streaming service Amazon Prime Video on September 23, 2022. It was estimated to have high viewership and received generally positive reviews.

Plot 
The Harfoots continue their migration to the Grove for the winter. While looking for food in a forest, Nori Brandyfoot, Poppy Proudfellow, and Malva Meadowgrass are attacked by a pack of wolves. The stranger accompanying them intervenes and uses magic to scare off the wolves, but his use of magic injures his own arm. He uses more magic to heal himself and nearly hurts Nori, frightening her. Meanwhile, a trio of mysterious women find the location where the stranger fell from the sky.

At the tower of Ostirith in the Southlands, Bronwyn attempts to prepare the other human refugees to defend themselves from the army of Orcs that are coming to claim their lands. Tavern owner Waldreg thinks they will be better off joining the Orcs and convinces around half of the refugees to leave with him. Waldreg is disappointed to learn that the leader of the Orcs, Adar, is not Sauron, but still chooses to serve him. To confirm his loyalty, Adar orders Waldreg to kill one of the other humans, Rowan. At the tower, Theo shows Arondir the broken sword the Orcs are hunting for and Arondir reveals that it was some sort of key designed to enslave the Southlanders.

Elendil denies his son Isildur's request to join Númenor's expedition to the Southlands, saying Isildur lost his chance to serve previously. Discussing the expedition with Queen Regent Míriel, Galadriel says the human Halbrand will be accompanying them to claim the throne of Southlands. He accuses Galadriel of using him and says he wants to remain in Númenor instead. Meanwhile, Chancellor Pharazôn's son Kemen attempts to convince his father to cancel the expedition to Middle-earth, but Pharazôn sees potential in turning the Southlands into a tributary state after its liberation. Míriel's father, King Tar-Palantir, warns her not to go to Middle-earth.

High-King Gil-galad reveals to Elrond that he knows of the existence of mithril, an ore that contains the light from a lost Silmaril that he believe can counteract the fading power of the Elves in Middle-earth. Elrond refuses to confirm that the Dwarves have discovered the ore, out of loyalty to Prince Durin IV, and Gil-galad accuses him of putting the Dwarves before his own race. Elrond later discusses the issue with Durin and the latter agrees to help. The pair return to Khazad-dûm to try convince King Durin III.

Kemen attempts to destroy the expedition ships and discovers Isildur stowing away. Isildur prevents the destruction of three of the five ships and saves Kemen's life. When questioned by Elendil, Isildur lies about Kemen's sabotage. He subsequently receives a spot on the expedition crew, as a stable sweep. Galadriel apologizes for using Halbrand and opens up to him. He eventually decides to go with the expeditionary force, and the remaining ships depart for Middle-earth.

Production

Development 
Amazon acquired the global television rights for J. R. R. Tolkien's The Lord of the Rings in November 2017. The company's streaming service, Amazon Prime Video, gave a multi-season commitment to a series based on the novel and its appendices, to be produced by Amazon Studios. It was later titled The Lord of the Rings: The Rings of Power. Amazon hired J. D. Payne and Patrick McKay to develop the series and serve as showrunners in July 2018. Justin Doble had joined the series as a writer by July 2019, and Wayne Che Yip was revealed to be directing four episodes of the first season in March 2021. The series is set in the Second Age of Middle-earth, thousands of years before the events of Tolkien's The Hobbit and The Lord of the Rings, and the first season focuses on introducing the setting and major heroic characters to the audience. Written by Doble and directed by Yip, the fifth episode is titled "Partings".

Casting 

The series' large cast includes Cynthia Addai-Robinson as Míriel, Robert Aramayo as Elrond, Owain Arthur as Durin IV, Maxim Baldry as Isildur, Nazanin Boniadi as Bronwyn, Morfydd Clark as Galadriel, Ismael Cruz Córdova as Arondir, Charles Edwards as Celebrimbor, Trystan Gravelle as Pharazôn, Lenny Henry as Sadoc Burrows, Ema Horvath as Eärien, Markella Kavenagh as Elanor "Nori" Brandyfoot, Tyroe Muhafidin as Theo, Lloyd Owen as Elendil, Megan Richards as Poppy Proudfellow, Dylan Smith as Largo Brandyfoot, Charlie Vickers as Halbrand, Leon Wadham as Kemen, Benjamin Walker as Gil-galad, Daniel Weyman as the Stranger, and Sara Zwangobani as Marigold Brandyfoot. Also starring are Beau Cassidy as Dilly Brandyfoot, Joseph Mawle as Adar, Ian Blackburn as Rowan, Geoff Morrell as Waldreg, Peter Tait as Tredwill, Thusitha Jayasundera as Malva, Maxine Cuncliffe as Vilma, Anthony Crum as Ontamo, Alex Tarrant as Valandil, Ken Blackburn as Tar-Palantir, Edith Poor as the Nomad, Kali Kopae as the Ascetic, Bridie Sisson as the Dweller, Edward Clendon as Grugzûk, and Ella Hope-Higginson as Mairen.

Filming 
Amazon confirmed in September 2019 that filming for the first season would take place in New Zealand, where the Lord of the Rings and Hobbit film trilogies were made. Filming primarily took place at Kumeu Film Studios and Auckland Film Studios in Auckland, under the working title Untitled Amazon Project or simply UAP. Production on episodes beyond the first two began in January 2021, and Yip confirmed that he had begun filming his episodes by March. Filming for the season wrapped on August 2.

Visual effects 
Visual effects for the episode were created by Industrial Light & Magic (ILM), Wētā FX, Method Studios, Rodeo FX, Cause and FX, Atomic Arts, and Cantina Creative.

Music 

A soundtrack album featuring composer Bear McCreary's score for the episode was released on Amazon Music on September 22, 2022. McCreary said the album contained "virtually every second of score" from the episode. It was added to other music streaming services after the full first season was released. All music composed by Bear McCreary:

Release 
"Partings" premiered on Prime Video in the United States on September 23, 2022. It was released at the same time around the world, in more than 240 countries and territories.

Reception

Viewership 
Software company Whip Media, who track viewership data for the 21 million worldwide users of their TV Time app, calculated that for the week ending September 25, two days after the episode's debut, The Rings of Power was the fifth-highest original streaming series for U.S. viewership. Nielsen Media Research, who record streaming viewership on U.S. television screens, estimated that the series was watched for 977 million minutes during the week ending September 25. This placed it fourth on the company's list of top streaming series and films. Fellow fantasy series House of the Dragon was third for the week, the first time it was ahead of The Rings of Power on the chart. Parrot Analytics determines audience "demand expressions" based on various data sources, including social media activity and comments on rating platforms. During the week ending September 30, the company calculated that The Rings of Power was 29.3 times more in demand than the average U.S. streaming series, placing it ninth on the company's top 10 list for the week.

Critical response 

The review aggregator website Rotten Tomatoes reported a 76% approval rating with an average score of 7.1/10 based on 29 reviews. The website's critics consensus reads: "The scenery is gorgeous as ever and the nods to Tolkien lore still dense, but The Rings of Power momentum feels stuck as a Harfoot's caravan in the mud."

Companion media 
An episode of the official aftershow Deadline's Inside the Ring: LOTR: The Rings of Power for "Partings" was released on September 24, 2022. Hosted by Deadline Hollywood Dominic Patten and Anthony D'Alessandro, it features exclusive "footage and insights" for the episode, plus interviews with cast members Clark, Vickers, Addai-Robinson, Gravelle, Horvath, and Wadham, as well as Yip, Doble, and McCreary. On October 14, The Official The Lord of the Rings: The Rings of Power Podcast was released on Amazon Music. Hosted by actress Felicia Day, the fifth episode is dedicated to "Partings" and features McCreary, Payne, and McKay. On November 21, a bonus segment featuring behind-the-scenes footage from the episode was added to Prime Video's X-Ray feature as part of a series titled "The Making of The Rings of Power".

References

External links 
 

2022 American television episodes
The Lord of the Rings: The Rings of Power